Tingena actinias is a species of moth in the family Oecophoridae. It is endemic to New Zealand and is found on the North and South Islands. The larvae of this species are leaf litter feeders. The preferred habitat of this species is shrubland and it has also been observed in gumland heaths and in beech forest.

Taxonomy 

This species was first described by Edward Meyrick in 1901 using four specimens collected by George Hudson in Wellington and named Borkhausenia actinias. In 1926 Alfred Philpott illustrated the male genitalia of this species but used the name Borkhausenia armigerella in his publication. In 1928 George Hudson discussed and illustrated this species in his publication The butterflies and moths of New Zealand as a variety of Borkhausenia armigerella (in the sense of Meyrick, not Walker). In 1988 J. S. Dugdale placed this species within the genus Tingena. This placement was confirmed in the Inventory of New Zealand Biodiversity. The male lectotype specimen is held at the Natural History Museum, London.

Description

Meyrick describe the adults of this species as follows:

Distribution
This species is endemic to New Zealand and has been collected in both the North and the South Islands.

Hosts and habitat 
The larvae of this species are leaf litter feeders and the preferred habitat is shrubland. This species has also been observed in New Zealand gumland heaths and in beech forests.

References

Oecophoridae
Moths of New Zealand
Moths described in 1901
Endemic fauna of New Zealand
Taxa named by Edward Meyrick
Endemic moths of New Zealand